Olaf Schmidt is an East German ski jumper.

In the first run in Zakopane within the 1st FIS Ski Jumping World Cup 1979/1980 he placed third.

References

German male ski jumpers
Living people
Year of birth missing (living people)
Place of birth missing (living people)
East German sportsmen